Robert Needham may refer to:
 Robert Needham, 1st Viscount Kilmorey (c. 1565–1631), English politician, MP for Shropshire
 Robert Needham, 2nd Viscount Kilmorey (c. 1591–1653), MP for Newcastle-under-Lyme, 1614, son of the above
 Sir Robert Needham (Haverfordwest MP), MP for Haverfordwest, 1645–1648

See also
 Robert Nedham, MP for Old Sarum 1734-1741
 Robert Needham Cust (1821–1909), British administrator and judge in India
 Robert Needham Philips (1815–1890), English textile merchant and manufacturer